Tornatellinops lidgbirdensis, also known as the Mount Lidgbird miniature treesnail, is a species of tree snail that is endemic to Australia's Lord Howe Island in the Tasman Sea.

Description
The elongately conical shell of adult snails is 3.7–4 mm in height, with a diameter of 1.6–1.8 mm, with a high spire, impressed sutures and rounded whorls. It is black and glossy with distinct growth lines. The umbilicus is imperforate. The aperture is subovate. The animal is black.

Habitat
The snail occurs only at the southern end of the island, inhabiting rock faces on the summit of Mount Lidgbird and the slopes of Mount Gower.

References

 
lidgbirdensis
Gastropods of Lord Howe Island
Taxa named by Tom Iredale
Gastropods described in 1944